EnergyCS is a Monrovia, California-based company specializing in integration and controls for high-energy, large format batteries.  The company provides battery management systems for lithium-ion batteries and other advance energy storage technologies and is active in the electric vehicle and stationary energy storage space.

EnergyCS is also a pioneer in the area of PHEV (Plug-in hybrid Electric Vehicles).  The company produced the first lithium-ion powered plug-in Prius.

External links
 EnergyCS website
 solar power energies

Grid energy storage
Manufacturing companies based in California
Technology companies based in Greater Los Angeles
Companies based in Los Angeles County, California
Monrovia, California
Electronics companies established in 2001
Manufacturing companies established in 2001
Renewable resource companies established in 2001
American companies established in 2001
2001 establishments in California